Here are the finalists and winners at the 2001 Billboard Music Awards.

Artist of the Year
 Destiny’s Child
Jennifer Lopez
Nelly
Shaggy

Female Artist of the Year
Dido
 
Alicia Keys
Jennifer Lopez
Destiny's Child
Janet Jackson

Male Artist of the Year
Ja Rule
Lenny Kravitz
Nelly
Shaggy

Artist of the Year – Duo/Group
112
Destiny’s Child
Lifehouse
Train

New Artist of the Year
Dream
Alicia Keys
Lifehouse
Linkin Park

Album of the Year
Backstreet Boys – Black & Blue
The Beatles – 1
Shaggy – Hotshot
Various artists – Now That’s What I Call Music! Vol. 5

Albums Artist of the Year
Backstreet Boys
The Beatles
’NSYNC
Shaggy

Male Albums Artist of the Year
Ja Rule
Tim McGraw
Nelly
Shaggy

Female Albums Artist of the Year
Enya
Alicia Keys
Sade
Britney Spears

Duo/Group Albums Artist of the Year
Backstreet Boys
The Beatles
Limp Bizkit
’NSYNC

Hot 100 Single of the Year
Janet Jackson – "All for You"
Alicia Keys – "Fallin'"
Lifehouse – "Hanging by a Moment"
Train – "Drops of Jupiter (Tell Me)"

Hot 100 Singles Artist of the Year
Destiny’s Child
Janet Jackson
Jennifer Lopez
Matchbox Twenty

Male Hot 100 Singles Artist of the Year
Ja Rule
Jay-Z
Lenny Kravitz
Nelly
Shaggy

Female Hot 100 Singles Artist of the Year
Destiny's Child
Dido
Janet Jackson
Alicia Keys
Jennifer Lopez

Hot 100 Singles Artist of the Year – Duo/Group
112
Destiny’s Child
Lifehouse
Matchbox Twenty

R&B/Hip-Hop Artist of the Year
Ja Rule
Jay-Z
R. Kelly
Musiq Soulchild

Male R&B/Hip-Hop Artist of the Year
Ja Rule
Jay-Z
R. Kelly
Musiq Soulchild

Female R&B/Hip-Hop Artist of the Year
Missy "Misdemeanor" Elliott
Eve
Alicia Keys
Aaliyah

R&B/Hip-Hop Artist of the Year – Duo/Group
112
Destiny’s Child
Jagged Edge
Outkast

New R&B/Hip-Hop Artist of the Year
Jaheim
Alicia Keys
Ludacris
Musiq Soulchild

R&B/Hip-Hop Album of the Year
Aaliyah – Aaliyah
Alicia Keys – Songs in A Minor
Shaggy – Hot Shot
Musiq Soulchild – Aijuswanaseing (I Just Want to Sing)

R&B/Hip-Hop Single of the Year
Case – "Missing You"
Jagged Edge w/ Nelly – "Where the Party At"
R. Kelly f/ Jay-Z – "Fiesta"
Musiq Soulchild – "Love"

Country Artist of the Year
Kenny Chesney
Toby Keith
Tim McGraw
Travis Tritt

Male Country Artist of the Year
Kenny Chesney
Toby Keith
Tim McGraw
Travis Tritt

Female Country Artist of the Year
Sara Evans
Jo Dee Messina
Jamie O’Neal
Lee Ann Womack

Country Artist of the Year – Duo/Group
Brooks & Dunn
Diamond Rio
Dixie Chicks
Lonestar

New Country Artist of the Year
Jamie O’Neal
Trick Pony
Blake Shelton
Cyndi Thomson

Country Album of the Year
Faith Hill – Breathe
Tim McGraw – Greatest Hits
Various artists – "Coyote Ugly" soundtrack
Various artists – "O Brother, Where Art Thou?" soundtrack

Country Single of the Year
Brooks & Dunn – "Ain’t Nothing ’Bout You"
Kenny Chesney – "Don’t Happen Twice"
Toby Keith – "You Shouldn’t Kiss Me Like This"
Travis Tritt – "It’s a Great Day to Be Alive"

Modern Rock Artist of the Year
Fuel
Incubus
Linkin Park
Staind

Modern Rock Single of the Year
Incubus – "Drive"
Lifehouse – "Hanging by a Moment"
Staind – "It’s Been Awhile"
Tool – "Schism"

Rock Artist of the Year
3 Doors Down
Godsmack
Linkin Park
Staind

Rock Single of the Year
Incubus - "Drive"
Fuel – "Hemorrhage (In My Hands)"
Godsmack – "Awake"
Staind – "It’s Been Awhile"
Tool – "Schism"

Rap Artist of the Year
City High
Lil’ Bow Wow
Lil’ Romeo
Outkast

Rap Single of the Year
City High – "What Would You Do?"
Lil’ Bow Wow – "Bow Wow (That’s My Name)"
Lil’ Romeo – "My Baby"
Outkast – "Ms. Jackson"

Special awards
Century Award: John Mellencamp
Artist Achievement Award: Janet Jackson
Biggest one-week sales for an album in 2001: NSYNC, Celebrity (Jive)
Special award for first four albums debuting at No. 1: DMX

References

External links

2001
Billboard awards
2001 music awards
2001 in American music
MGM Grand Garden Arena